Marc Cary (born January 29, 1967) is a post bop jazz pianist based out of New York City. Cary has played and recorded with several well-known musicians, including Dizzy Gillespie, Betty Carter, Roy Hargrove, Arthur Taylor, Abbey Lincoln, Carlos Garnett, Erykah Badu, Meshell Ndegeocello, Stefon Harris, Lauryn Hill, Ani DiFranco, Jackie McLean, Q-Tip and Carmen McRae.

Cary grew up playing on the go-go music scene in Washington, D.C. He eventually moved to New York City, and it was through his work with Abbey Lincoln that broad audiences were first introduced to his rhythmic style, which draws on the influence of Randy Weston and McCoy Tyner.

Discography

As leader/co-leader

As sideman
With David Murray
Be My Monster Love (Motéma, 2013)

Honors and awards
Best New Jazz Artist Award 2000—Billboard/BET
Grammy Nominations for work with Roy Hargrove, Betty Carter, Stefon Harris & Abbey Lincoln
One of Downbeat Magazine's "25 for the future of Jazz!"
Nammy Nomination 2003
Downbeat, "Rising Star: Keyboard," 2014

Notes

American jazz pianists
American male pianists
Post-bop jazz musicians
Living people
Arabesque Records artists
1967 births
20th-century American pianists
21st-century American pianists
20th-century American male musicians
21st-century American male musicians
American male jazz musicians
Motéma Music artists
Enja Records artists